Rumnicus costatus is a species of beetles in the family Monotomidae, the only species in the genus Rumnicus.

References

Monotomidae
Monotypic Cucujoidea genera